Phylliscidiopsis is a genus of lichenized fungi in the family Lichinaceae. It is monotypic, containing the single species Phylliscidiopsis abissinica.

References

Lichinomycetes
Lichen genera
Monotypic Ascomycota genera
Taxa described in 1937